Evans & Sutherland is a pioneering American computer firm in the computer graphics field. Its current products are used in digital projection environments like planetariums. Its simulation business, which it sold to Rockwell Collins, sold products that were used primarily by the military and large industrial firms for training and simulation.

History

The company was founded in 1968 by David C. Evans and Ivan Sutherland, professors in the Computer Science Department at the University of Utah. who were pioneers in computer graphics technology.  They formed the company to produce hardware to run the systems being developed in the University, working from an abandoned barracks on the university grounds. The company was later housed in the University of Utah Research Park. Most of the employees were active or former students, and included Jim Clark, who started Silicon Graphics, Ed Catmull, co-founder of Pixar, John Warnock of Adobe, and Scott P. Hunter of Oracle.

In the early 1970s they purchased General Electric's flight simulator division and formed a partnership with Rediffusion Simulation, a UK-based flight simulator company, to design and build digital flight simulators. For the next three decades this was E&S's primary market, delivering display systems with enough brightness to light up a simulator cockpit to daytime light levels. These simulators were used for training in in-flight refueling, carrier landing, AWACS, and B52.

Later in the 1970s the company expanded their line of simulation systems, first building a five-projector graphics system to simulate a ship steaming into New York Harbor and through its surroundings. This graphics system was installed on the mock-up of a ship's bridge and used to train ship's pilots how to navigate into and out of New York Harbor. The project, called CAORF (Computer Aided Operations Research Facility), was built for the US Maritime Academy.  The project paved the way for other visual simulation systems including a NASA Space Shuttle manipulator arm, EVS, submarine periscope and space station docking simulators.

In the mid 1970s until the end of the 1980s, E&S produced the LDS-1 (Line Drawing System-1), Picture System 1, 2 and PS300 series. These unique "calligraphic" (analog vector drawing) color displays had depth cueing and could draw large wireframe models and manipulate (rotate, shift, zoom) them in real time. They were used both in chemistry by pharmaceutical companies to visualize large molecules such as enzymes or polynucleotides, and by aerospace companies, such as Boeing, McDonnell-Douglas and others, to design aircraft. The end of the Picture System line came in the late 1980s, when raster devices on workstations could render anti-aliased lines faster.

In 1978 the company went public with a listing on NASDAQ.

In the 1980s E&S added a Digital Theater division, supplying all-digital projectors to create immersive mass-audience experiences at planetariums, visitor attractions and similar education and entertainment venues. Digital Theater grew to become a major arm of E&S commercial activity with hundreds of Digistar 1 and 2 systems installed around the world, such as at the Saint Louis Science Center in St. Louis, Missouri.

In the mid-1980s Evans & Sutherland introduced a geometric modeling system called CDRS, that provided high quality surface design capabilities together with a photo-realistic rendering system. CDRS was sold to many well known manufacturers including both Ford & Chrysler. CDRS was acquired by Parametric Technology Corporation in 1995.

For a brief period between 1986 and 1989 E&S was also a supercomputer vendor, but their ES-1 was released just as the supercomputer market was drying up in the post-cold war military wind-down. Only a handful of machines were built, most broken up for scrap. One sample ES-1 is in storage at the Computer History Museum.

During the 1990s E&S tried to expand into several other commercial markets.  The Freedom Series graphics engine was developed to work with Sun Microsystems, IBM, Hewlett Packard, and DEC workstations.  3D Pro technology was developed for the first wave of 3D graphics cards for PCs.  Also, the MindSet virtual set system was created to address the needs of the broadcast video market.

In 1993 Evans and Sutherland helped Japanese arcade giant Namco with texture-mapping technology in Namco's System 22 arcade board that powered Ridge Racer.  The help that E&S gave Namco was similar to the help that Martin Marietta gave Sega with the MODEL 2 board that powered Daytona USA and Desert Tank arcade games.

In 1998 Evans and Sutherland acquired AccelGraphics Inc, a manufacturer of computer graphics boards, for $52m.

Since its launch in July 2002, the company's Digistar 3 system became the world's fastest selling Digital Theater system and is installed in upwards of 120 fulldome venues worldwide.

On May 9, 2006 Evans & Sutherland acquired Spitz Inc, a rival vendor in the planetarium market, giving the combined business the largest base of installed planetaria worldwide and adding in-house projection-dome manufacturing capability to E&S' offering.

In 2006 Evans and Sutherland sold its simulation business, which for decades was the core of the company, to Rockwell Collins.

On February 10, 2020 Elevate Entertainment and Evans & Sutherland announced that Elevate would purchase E&S for $1.19 per share in cash in a transaction valued at $14,500,000.

Use in movies and special effects
An Evans & Sutherland computer was used in the creation of the Project Genesis simulation sequence in Star Trek II: The Wrath of Khan (1982). The star fields, and the tactical bridge displays on the Kobayashi Maru simulator and USS Enterprise were created by Evans & Sutherland employees and filmed directly from the screen of a prototype Digistar system at company headquarters. This film was one of the first ever to use computer graphics (after Futureworld in 1976). Star fields and some of the other shots were reused in Star Trek III: The Search for Spock (1984)  and later films.

NBC would later use an Evans & Sutherland Picture System for its 1984–1985 promotional campaign "Let's All Be There!", as well as subsequent campaigns, concluding with the 1989–1990 season promotional campaign "Come Home to the Best!".

Products

Terminals
 LDS-1 (Line Drawing System-1)
 Picture System
 Picture System 2
 PS/300 Picture System (variations included PS/340 which could render a still frame image using an internal framebuffer)
 PS/390 Picture System/390 (first to use a raster scan display as the primary monitor)

Workstations
 VAXstation 8000 
(Co-developed graphics accelerator with DEC)
 ESV/3
 ESV/10
 ESV/50

Accelerators
 Freedom series

Simulation image generators
 Novoview SP1 and SP2 (the 6000 light systems)
 SPX
 CT5
 ESIG-2000
 ESIG-3000
 ESIG-4000
 Harmony
 EPX

Simulation display products
 CSM (Caligraphic Shadowmask Monitor)
 VistaView head-tracked projector
 TargetView
 TargetView 200
 ESCP raster/calligraphic projector

Planetarium products
 Digistar (1983)
 Digistar II (1995)
 Digistar 3 (2002)
 Digistar 4 (2008)
 Digistar 5 (2012)
 Digistar 6 (2016)
 Digistar 7 (2020)

Modeling Systems 

 CDRS

Supercomputers
 ES-1

References

External links

Rockwell Collins official website

Computer companies of the United States
Graphics hardware companies
Manufacturing companies based in Salt Lake City
1968 establishments in Utah
Planetarium projection